David Ross Rackley  (born October 11, 1981) is an American Major League Baseball umpire. He made his Major League umpiring debut on August 13, 2010. He wears uniform number 86.

Before reaching the Major Leagues, Rackley umpired in the Arizona, Northwest, South Atlantic, California, Texas, International, Florida Instructional, and Arizona Instructional leagues. Rackley also umpired the 2007 All-Star Futures Game, and is an instructor at the Harry Wendelstedt Umpire School.

He was hired to the full-time MLB staff prior to the 2014 season and worked his first postseason during the 2016 American League Wild Card Game.

See also 

 List of Major League Baseball umpires

References

External links
 MLBUC Profile
 Retrosheet

1981 births
Living people
Major League Baseball umpires
Sportspeople from Houston